Dead Man's Curve is an American nickname for a curve in a road that has claimed lives because of numerous crashes.

Examples
 A curve on Sunset Boulevard in Los Angeles memorialized in the hit song "Dead Man's Curve" by Jan and Dean. The song's lyrics place the location of the "Dead Man's Curve" accident at the curve on westbound Sunset Boulevard just west of Doheny Drive in West Hollywood. Voice actor Mel Blanc was severely injured while driving here in 1961, and later sued the City of Los Angeles, prompting a reconstruction of the road. However, the earlier lyrics suggest the long straight starting at "Sunset and Vine" and going past "LaBrea, Schwab's (Pharmacy), and Crescent Heights" (Blvd) would suggest the first curve hit (at a high speed) would be the one at Malmont Lane, 2.4 miles before Doheny.  (As it is, the "drag" from Vine to Malmont is also 2.4 miles, but entirely straight.) 
 A sharp turn on eastbound Interstate 70 just west of exit 259 near Morrison, Colorado that is preceded by a  stretch of a 6.5% grade downslope, which has been the site of numerous fatal runaway truck accidents.
 In Marquette Township in Marquette County, Michigan, Dead Man's Curve referred to a curve on County Road 492, where the first state highway center line in the United States was painted when the road was part of State Highway M-15.
 Between Albuquerque and Tijeras, State Road 333 (previously known as U.S. Route 66) makes a sudden curve near the I-40 overpass. This stretch of highway has earned its name because of the rocky cliffs on the south side of the highway, and frequent deer traffic contributes to its hazardousness.
 Union Square, Manhattan had a long history of traffic congestion extending back to the 1890s, when trolley lines were first installed. Two parallel trolley lines made a double curve at the southwest corner of Broadway and Fourteenth Street. In spite of traffic wardens on duty, the trolleys regularly struck pedestrians crossing the tracks in the busy shopping district around the park. By 1930,  the Fourteenth Street Association, a retail business association headed by its president, H. Prescott Beach, had successfully lobbied the New York transit authority to remove the above-ground rails, and move routes underground. 
 The nearly 90° turn on Interstate 90 near downtown Cleveland, officially called the "Innerbelt Curve", where the Cleveland Memorial Shoreway connects to the Innerbelt Freeway at a modified trumpet interchange just south of Burke Lakefront Airport.
 A dangerous curve on South Carolina Highway 9 about 10 miles west of Chester, South Carolina, has been the site of several fatal crashes.
 A curve on Schuylkill Expressway, a section of Interstate 76, near Conshohocken known as the Conshohocken Curve by many people, has been the site of several fatal and nonfatal crashes.

See also
 Hairpin curve
 Slaughter alley
 Kamikaze Curve

References

Interstate 90
Roads in Ohio
Transportation in Cleveland
Road hazards